This is a list of state leaders in the 17th century (1601–1700) AD, of the Holy Roman Empire.

Main

Holy Roman Empire, Kingdom of Germany
Emperors Elect, Kings –
Rudolph II, Emperor Elect (1576–1612), King (1575–1612)
Matthias, Emperor Elect (1612–1619), King (1612–1618)
Ferdinand II, Emperor Elect (1619–1637), King (1618–1637)
Ferdinand III, Emperor Elect (1637–1657), King (1636–1657)
Ferdinand IV, co-King (1653–1654)
Leopold I, Emperor Elect, King (1658–1705)
 –
Rudolf Coraduz von und zu Nußdorf, Vice Chancellor (1597–1606)
Leopold von Stralendorf, Vice Chancellor (1606–1612)
Hans Ludwig von Ulm, Vice Chancellor (1612–1627)
Peter Heinrich von Stralendorf, Vice Chancellor (1627–1637)
Ferdinand Sigismund Graf Kurtz von Senftenau, Vice Chancellor (1637–1659)
Wilderich von Walderdorff, Vice Chancellor (1660–1669)
Leopold Wilhelm Graf von Königsegg-Rothenfels, Vice Chancellor (1669–1694)
Gottlieb Amadeus Graf von Windisch-Graetz, Vice Chancellor (1694–1695)
Dominik Andreas I. von Kaunitz, Vice Chancellor (1698–1705)

Austrian

Archduchy of Austria (complete list) –
Rudolf V, Archduke (1576–1608)
Matthias, Archduke (1608–1619)
Albert VII, Archduke (1619)
Ferdinand III, Archduke (1590, 1619–1637)
Ferdinand IV, Archduke (1637–1657)
Leopold V, Archduke (1623–1632)
Ferdinand Charles, Archduke (1632–1662)
Sigismund Francis, Archduke (1662–1665)
Leopold VI, Archduke (1657, 1665–1705)

Principality of Auersperg (complete list) –
Johann Weikhard, Prince (1653–1677)
Johann Ferdinand, Prince (1677–1705)

Prince-Bishopric of Brixen (complete list) –
, Prince-bishop (1601–1613)
Charles of Austria, Prince-bishop (1613–1624)
, Prince-bishop (1625–1627)
, Prince-bishop (1627–1628)
, Prince-bishop (1629–1641)
, Prince-bishop (1641–1647)
, Prince-bishop (1647–1663)
, Prince-bishop (1663–1677)
, Prince-bishop (1677–1685)
, Prince-bishop (1685–1702)

Duchy of Carinthia (complete list) –
Ferdinand II, Duke (1590–1637)

Prince-Bishopric of Chur (complete list) –
Peter de Raschèr, Prince-bishop (1581–1601)
Johannes V. Flugi, Prince-bishop (1601–1627)
Joseph Mohr von Zernez, Prince-bishop (1627–1635)
Johannes VI. Flugi von Aspermont, Prince-bishop (1636–1661)
Ulrich VI. de Mont, Prince-bishop (1661–1692)
Ulrich VII. Freiherr von Federspiel, Prince-bishop (1692–1728)

Principality of Heitersheim (complete list) –
, Prince-prior (1599–1601)
, Prince-prior (1601–1607)
, Prince-prior (1607–1612)
, Prince-prior (1612–1635)
, Prince-prior (1635–1647)
Frederick of Hesse-Darmstadt, Prince-prior (1647–1682)
, Prince-prior (1682)
, Prince-prior (1683)
, Prince-prior (1683–1704)

Liechtenstein (complete list) –
Karl I, Prince (1608–1627)
Karl Eusebius, Prince (1627–1684)
Hans-Adam I, Prince (1684–1712)

Duchy of Styria (complete list) –
Ferdinand II, Duke (1590–1637)

Tarasp –
1684–1864

Prince-Bishopric of Trent (complete list) –
Carlo Gaudenzio Madruzzo, Prince-bishop (1600–1629)
Carlo Emanuele Madruzzo, Prince-bishop (1629–1658)
Sigismund Francis of Austria, Prince-bishop (1659–1665)
Ernst Adalbert von Harrach, Prince-bishop (1665–1667)
Sigismund Alfons von Thun, Prince-bishop (1668–1677)
Francesco Alberti di Pola, Prince-bishop (1677–1689)
Giuseppe Vittorio Alberti di Enno, Prince-bishop (1689–1695)
Johann Michael Graf von Spaur, Prince-bishop (1696–1725)

Bavarian

Duchy/ Electorate of Bavaria (complete list) –
Maximilian I, Duke (1597–1623), Elector (1623–1651)
Ferdinand Maria, Elector (1651–1679)
Maximilian II Emanuel, Elector (1679–1726)

Berchtesgaden Prince-Provostry (complete list) –
Ferdinand of Bavaria, Prince-provost (1594–1650)
Maximilian Heinrich of Bavaria, Prince-provost (1650–1688)
Joseph Clemens of Bavaria, Prince-provost (1688–1723)

Prince-Bishopric of Freising (complete list) –
Ernest of Bavaria, Prince-bishop (1566–1612)
Stephen of Seiboldsdorf, Prince-bishop (1612–1618)
Veit Adam of Gepeckh, Prince-bishop (1618–1651)
Albert Sigismund of Bavaria, Prince-bishop (1651/52–1685)
Joseph Clemens of Bavaria, Prince-bishop (1685–1694)
John Francis Eckher of Kapfing and Liechteneck, Prince-bishop (1694/95–1727)

Landgraviate of Leuchtenberg (de:complete list) –
, Landgrave (1567–1613)
, Landgrave (1614–1621)
, Landgrave (1621–1646)

Prince-Abbey of Niedermünster (complete list) –
Katharina II Scheifflin, Abbess (1598–1605)
Eva von Uhrhausen, Abbess (1605–1616)
Anna Maria von Salis, Abbess (1616–1652)
Maria Margarethe von Sigertshofen, Abbess (1652–1675)
Maria Theresia von Muggenthal, Abbess (1675–1693)
Regina Recordin von Rein und Hamberg, Abbess (1693–1697)
Johanna Franziska Sibylla von Muggenthal, Abbess (1697–1723)

Prince-Abbey of Obermünster (complete list) –
Margarethe II Mufflin, Abbess (1594–1608)
Katharina Praxedis von Perckhausen, Abbess (1608–1649)
Maria Elisabeth von Salis, Abbess (1649–1683)
Maria Theresia von Sandizell, Abbess (1683–1719)

Imperial County of Ortenburg (complete list) –
Henry VII, Count (1600–1603)
George IV, Count (1603–1627)
Frederick Casimir, Count (1627–1658)
George Reinhard, Count (1658–1666)
Christian, Count (1666–1684)
George Philip, Count (1684–1702)

Palatinate-Birkenfeld-Gelnhausen –
John Charles, Count (1654–1704)

Palatinate-Sulzbach –
Otto Henry, Count (1569–1604)
Augustus, Count (1614–1632)
Christian Augustus, Count (1632–1708)

Pappenheim (complete list) –
Philip, Lord (1558–1619)
Wolfgang Christopher, Lord (1585–1628), Count (1628–1635)
Wolfgang Philip, Count (1628–1671)
Charles Philip Gustav, Count (1671–1692)
Louis Francis, Count (1692–1697)
Christian Ernest, co-Count (1697–1721)

Prince-Bishopric of Passau (complete list) –
Leopold V, Archduke of Austria, Prince-Bishop (1598–1625)
Archduke Leopold Wilhelm of Austria, Prince-Bishop (1625–1662)
Archduke Charles Joseph of Austria, Prince-Bishop (1662–1664)
Wenzeslaus of Thun, Prince-Bishop (1664–1673)
Sebastian of Pötting, Prince-Bishop (1673–1689)
John Philip of Lamberg, Prince-Bishop (1689–1712)

Prince-Bishopric of Regensburg (complete list) –
Wolfgang II von Hausen, Prince-bishop (1600–1613)
Albert IV von Toerring-Stein, Prince-bishop (1613–1649)
Franz Wilhelm von Wartenberg, Prince-bishop (1649–1661)
Johann Georg von Herberstein, Prince-bishop (1662–1663)
Adam Lorenz von Toerring-Stein, Prince-bishop (1663–1666)
Guidobald von Thun, Prince-bishop (1666–1668)
Albrecht Sigismund von Bayern, Prince-bishop (1668–1685)
Joseph Clemens of Bavaria, Prince-bishop (1685–1716)

Prince-Archbishopric of Salzburg (complete list) –
Wolf Dietrich von Raitenau, Prince-archbishop (1587–1612)
Marcus Sittich of Hohenems, Prince-archbishop (1612–1619)
Paris von Lodron, Prince-archbishop (1619–1653)
Guidobald of Thun, Prince-archbishop (1654–1668)
Maximilian Gandalf of Kuenburg, Prince-archbishop (1668–1687)
Johann Ernst von Thun und Hohenstein, Prince-archbishop (1687–1709)

Bohemian and Hungary

Kingdom of Bohemia, Kingdom of Hungary (complete list, complete list) –
Rudolph II, King of Bohemia (1576–1611), of Hungary (1576–1608)
Matthias, King of Bohemia (1611–1619), of Hungary (1608–1619)
Ferdinand II, King of Bohemia (1617–1619, 1620–1637), of Hungary (1619–1637)
Frederick, King of Bohemia (1619–1620)	
Ferdinand III, King of Bohemia (1627–1657), of Hungary (1637–1657)
Ferdinand IV, co-King of Bohemia (1646–1657), of Hungary (1647–1654)
Leopold I, King of Bohemia (1656–1705), of Hungary (1657–1705)

Margraviate of Moravia  (complete list) –
Rudolf II, Margrave (1576–1608)
Matthias II, Margrave (1608–1617)
under the rule of the Bohemian kings since 1611

Duchy of Cieszyn (Teschen) (complete list) –
Adam Wenceslaus, Duke (1579–1617)
Frederick William, Duke (1617–1625)
Elizabeth Lucretia, Duchess (1625–1653)

Burgundian-Low Countries

County of Artois (complete list) –
Isabella Clara Eugenia, Countess, and Albert, Count (1598–1621)
Philip IV of Spain, Count (1621–1659)
For the succeeding rulers, see the County of Artois under the List of state leaders in the 17th century

County of Burgundy (complete list) –
Isabella Clara Eugenia, Countess, and Albert, Count (1598–1621)
Philip VIII, Count (1621–1665) 
Charles III, Count (1665–1678)

Duchy of Brabant (complete list) –
Isabella Clara Eugenia, Duchess, Albert, Duke (1598–1621)
Philip V, Duke (1621–1665)
Charles III, Duke (1665–1700)
Philip VI, Duke (1700–1706)

County of Flanders (complete list) –
Isabella Clara Eugenia, Countess (1598–1621)
Philip VI, Count (1621–1665)
Charles IV, Count (1665–1700)
Philip VII, Count (1700–1706)

Upper Guelders (complete list) –
under the Habsburg Monarchy
Herman van den Bergh, Stadtholder (1593–1611)
Frederik van den Bergh, Stadtholder (1611–1618)
Hendrik van den Bergh, Stadtholder (1618–1632)
occupation by the Dutch Republic (1632–1637)
Willem Bette, Stadtholder (1640–1646)
Jan Koenraard van Aubremont, Stadtholder (1646–1652)
Filips Balthasar van Gendt, Stadtholder (1652–1680)
Johan Frans Desideratus of Nassau-Siegen, Stadtholder (1680–1699)
Philippe Emanuel, Stadtholder (1699–1702)

County of Hainaut (complete list) –
under the Habsburg Monarchy
Charles III de Croÿ, Stadtholder (1592–1606)
Charles Bonaventure de Longueval, Stadtholder (1613–?)
Philippe François, Stadtholder (1663–1674)

County of Holland, Lordship of Utrecht, County of Zeeland (complete list) –
under the Habsburg Monarchy
Maurice, Stadtholder (1585–1625)
Frederick Henry, Stadtholder (1625–1647)
William II, Stadtholder (1647–1650)
First Stadtholderless Period (1650–1672)
William III, Stadtholder (1672–1702)

Duchy of Limburg (complete list) –
Isabella, Duchess, and Albert, Duke (1598–1621)
Philip V, Duke (1621–1665)
Charles III, Duke (1665–1700)
Philip VI, Duke (1700–1706)

Duchy of Luxemburg 
Limburg-Luxemburg dynasty (complete list) –
Isabella Clara Eugenia, Duchess, and Albert, Duke (1598–1621)
Philip IV, Duke (1621–1665)
Charles IV, Duke (1665–1700)
Philip V, Duke (1700–1712)
Stadtholders (complete list) –
Peter Ernst I von Mansfeld-Vorderort, Stadtholder (1545–1552, 1559–1604)
Philip of Croÿ-Ligne, Stadtholder (1654–1675)
John Charles de Landas, acting Stadtholder (1675–late 17th century)
Ernst of Croÿ-Ligne, Stadtholder (late 17th century)
Henry de Lambert, Stadtholder (1684–1688)

County of Namur (complete list) –
Isabella Clara Eugenia, Margravine (1598–1621)
Philip VI, Margrave (1621–1665)
Charles III, Margrave (1665–1700)

Franconian

Prince-Bishopric of Bamberg (complete list) –
Johann Philipp von Gebsattel, Prince-bishop (1599–1609)
Johann Gottfried von Aschhausen, Prince-bishop (1609–1622)
Johann Georg Fuchs von Dornheim, Prince-bishop (1623–1633)
Franz von Hatzfeld, Prince-bishop (1633–1642 (Bishop of Würzburg, Prince-bishop (1631–1642)
Melchior Otto von Voit von Salzburg, Prince-bishop (1642–1653)
Philipp Valentin Albrecht Voit von Rieneck, Prince-bishop (1653–1672)
Peter Philipp von Dernbach, Prince-bishop (1672–1683)
Marquard Sebastian von Schenk von Stauffenberg, Prince-bishop (1683–1693)
Lothar Franz von Schönborn, Prince-bishop (1693–1729)

Brandenburg-Ansbach  (complete list) –
George Frederick I, Margrave of Brandenburg-Ansbach (1543–1603), of Brandenburg-Kulmbach (1553–1603)
Joachim Ernst, Margrave (1603–1625)
Frederick, Margrave (1625–1634)
Albert, Margrave (1634–1667)
John Frederick, Margrave (1667–1686)
Christian Albrecht, Margrave (1686–1692)
George Frederick II, Margrave (1692–1703)

Brandenburg-Bayreuth (formally Brandenburg-Kulmbach) (complete list) –
George Frederick I, Margrave of Brandenburg-Ansbach (1543–1603), of Brandenburg-Kulmbach (1553–1603)
Christian, Margrave (1603–1655)
Christian Ernst, Margrave (1655–1712)

Prince-Bishopric of Eichstätt (complete list, de) –
Johann Konrad von Gemmingen, Prince-bishop (1595–1612)
Johann Christoph von Westerstetten, Prince-bishop (1612–1636)
, Prince-bishop (1637–1685)
, Prince-bishop (1685–1697)
, Prince-bishop (1697–1704)

Hohenlohe-Bartenstein (complete list) –
, Count (1688–1729)

Hohenlohe-Langenburg (complete list) –
Philip Ernest, Count (1610–1628)
Ludwig Kraft, Count (1628–1632)
Joachim Albert, Count (1632–1650)
Henry Frederick, Count (1650–1699)
Albert Wolfgang, Count (1699–1715)

Hohenlohe-Neuenstein –
Philipp, co-Count of Hohenlohe-Neuenstein (1568–1586), Count (1586–1606)
Wolfgang, co-Count of Hohenlohe-Neuenstein (1568–1586), Count of Hohenlohe-Weikersheim (1586–1606),  of Hohenlohe-Neuenstein (1586–1610)
Kraft III, Count (1610–1641)
Kraft Magnus, co-Count (1645–c.1677)
Philipp Maximilian Johann, co-Count (1645–c.1677)
Johann Friedrich, co-Count of Hohenlohe-Neuenstein (1645–1677), Count of Hohenlohe-Oehringen (1677–1702)
Johann Ludwig, co-Count of Hohenlohe-Neuenstein (1645–1677), Count of Hohenlohe-Künzelsau (1677–1689)
Siegfried, co-Count of Hohenlohe-Neuenstein (1645–1677), Count of Hohenlohe-Weikersheim (1677–1684)
Wolfgang Julius, co-Count of Hohenlohe-Neuenstein (1645–1677), Count of Hohenlohe-Neuenstein (1677–1698)

Hohenlohe-Waldenburg-Pfedelbach –
Ludwig Eberhard of Hohenlohe-Waldenburg-Pfedelbach (1600–1650)
Friedrich Kraft of Hohenlohe-Waldenburg-Pfedelbach (1650–1681)
Hezekiah of Hohenlohe-Waldenburg-Pfedelbach and Gleichen (1681–1685)
Ludwig Gottfried of Hohenlohe-Waldenburg-Pfedelbach (1685–1728)

Hohenlohe-Waldenburg-Schillingsfürst (complete list) –
Louis Gustav, Count (1688–1697)
Philipp Ernst zu Hohenlohe-Waldenburg-Schillingsfürst, Count (1697–1744), Prince (1744–1750)

Hohenlohe-Weikersheim –
Wolfgang, co-Count of Hohenlohe-Neuenstein (1568–1586), Count of Hohenlohe-Weikersheim (1586–1606),  of Hohenlohe-Neuenstein (1586–1610)
Georg Friedrich II, Count (1600–1635)
Georg Friedrich, Count of Hohenlohe-Weikersheim (1610–1645)

Schönborn (complete list) –
Philip Erwin, Baron (1663–1668)
John Erwin, Baron (1668–1701), Count (1701–1705)

Prince-Bishopric of Würzburg (complete list) –
Julius Echter von Mespelbrunn, Prince-bishop (1573–1617)
Johann Gottfried von Aschhausen, Prince-bishop (1617–1622)
Philipp Adolf von Ehrenberg, Prince-bishop (1622–1631)
Franz von Hatzfeld, Prince-bishop (1631–1642)
Johann Philipp von Schönborn, Prince-bishop (1642–1673)
Johann Hartmann von Rosenbach, Prince-bishop (1673–1675)
Peter Philipp von Dernbach, Prince-bishop (1675–1683)
Konrad Wilhelm von Wernau, Prince-bishop (1683–1684)
Johann Gottfried II von Gutenberg, Prince-bishop (1684–1698)
Johann Philipp von Greifenclau zu Vollraths, Prince-bishop (1699–1719)

Electoral Rhenish

Arenberg (complete list) –
Charles, Princely Count (1599–1616)
Philip Charles, Princely Count (1616–1640)
Philippe François, Princely Count (1640–1645), Duke (1645–1675)
Charles Eugene, Duke (1675–1681)
Philip Charles, Duke (1681–1691)
Leopold, Duke (1691–1754)

Elector-Archbishopric of Cologne (complete list) –
Ernest of Bavaria, Archbishop-elector (1583–1612)
Ferdinand of Bavaria, Archbishop-elector (1612–1650)
Maximilian Henry of Bavaria, Archbishop-elector (1650–1688)
Joseph Clemens of Bavaria, Archbishop-elector (1688–1723)

Elector-Bishopric of Mainz (complete list) –
Wolfgang von Dalberg, Archbishop-elector (1582–1601)
Johann Adam von Bicken, Archbishop-elector (1601–1604)
Johann Schweikhard von Kronberg, Archbishop-elector (1604–1626)
Georg Friedrich von Greiffenklau, Archbishop-elector (1626–1629)
Anselm Casimir Wambold von Umstadt, Archbishop-elector (1629–1647)
Johann Philipp von Schönborn, Archbishop-elector (1647–1673)
Lothar Friedrich von Metternich-Burscheid, Archbishop-elector (1673–1675)
Damian Hartard von der Leyen-Hohengeroldseck, Archbishop-elector (1675–1678)
Karl Heinrich von Metternich-Winneburg, Archbishop-elector (1679)
Anselm Franz von Ingelheim, Archbishop-elector (1679–1695)
Lothar Franz von Schönborn, Archbishop-elector (1695–1729)

Nieder-Isenburg (Lower Isenburg) (complete list) –
Salentin VIII, Count (1532–1610)
Salentin IX, Count (1580–1619)
Ernst, Count (1584–1664)

Electoral Palatinate (complete list) –
Palatinate-Birkenfeld-Bischweiler
Palatinate-Birkenfeld-Gelnhausen
Palatinate-Kleeburg
Palatinate-Landsberg
Palatinate-Neuburg
Palatinate-Simmern
Palatinate-Sulzbach
Palatinate-Sulzbach-Hilpoltsein
Palatinate-Veldenz
Palatinate-Veldenz-Gutenberg
Palatinate-Veldenz-Lützelstein
Palatinate-Zweibrücken
Palatinate-Zweibrücken-Birkenfeld
Otto Henry, Count Palatine of Sulzbach (1569–1604)
Philip Louis, Count Palatine of Neuburg (1569–1604)
Philip Louis, Count Palatine of Neuburg and Sulzbach (1604–1614)
Frederick IV the Righteous, Elector (1583–1610)
George Gustavus, Count Palatine of Veldenz (1598–1634)
John Augustus, Count Palatine of Veldenz-Lützelstein (1598–1611)
Louis Philip I, Count Palatine of Veldenz-Gutenberg (1598–1601)
George John II, Count Palatine of Veldenz-Gutenberg (1598–1654)
George William, Count Palatine of Zweibrücken-Birkenfeld (1608–1669)
Christian I, Count Palatine of Birkenfeld-Gelnhausen (1615–1654)
John II the Younger, Count Palatine of Zweibrücken (1604–1635)
Frederick Casimir, Count Palatine of Landsberg (1604–1645)
John Casimir, Count Palatine of Kleeburg (1604–1652)
Frederick V the Winter King, Elector (1610–1623)
Electoral Palatinate briefly annexed to Maximilian I, Electorate of Bavaria (1623–1648)
Louis Philip II, Count Palatine of Simmern (1610–1655)
Wolfgang William, Count Palatine of Neuburg (1614–1653)
Augustus, Count Palatine of Sulzbach (1614–1632)
John Frederick, Count Palatine of Sulzbach-Hilpoltsein (1614–1644)
Christian Augustus, Count Palatine of Sulzbach (1632–1708)
Leopold Louis, Count Palatine of Veldenz (1634–1694)
Frederick I, Count Palatine of Zweibrücken (1635–1661)
Frederick Louis, Count Palatine of Landsberg (1645–1661)
Frederick Louis, Count Palatine of Zweibrücken (1661–1677)
Charles Louis, Elector (1648–1680)
Charles Gustavus, Count Palatine of Kleeburg (1652–1654)
Adolph John I, Count Palatine of Kleeburg (1654–1689)
Louis Henry, Count Palatine of Simmern (1655–1674)
Charles Otto, Count Palatine of Zweibrücken-Birkenfeld (1669–1671)
Christian II, Count Palatine of Birkenfeld-Gelnhausen (1654–1671)
Charles II, Elector (1680–1685)
Philip William, Count Palatine of Neuburg (1653–1685)
Philip William, Elector (1685–1690)
Charles III, Count Palatine of Zweibrücken (1693–1697)
John Charles, Count Palatine of Birkenfeld-Gelnhausen (1654–1704)
Christian II, Count Palatine of Zweibrücken-Birkenfeld (1671–1717)
Adolph John II, Count Palatine of Kleeburg (1689–1701)
John William, Elector (1690–1716)

Thurn und Taxis (complete list) –
Lamoral von Taxis, Count of Taxis (1624)
, Count of Taxis (1624–1628)
Alexandrine von Taxis, Regent (1628–1646)
Lamoral II Claudius Franz, Count (1628–1676)
Eugen Alexander, Count (1676–1695), Prince (1695–1714)

Elector-Bishopric of Trier (complete list) –
Lothar von Metternich, Archbishop-elector (1599–1623)
Philipp Christoph von Sötern, Archbishop-elector (1623–1652)
Karl Kaspar von der Leyen-Hohengeroldseck, Archbishop-elector (1652–1676)
Johann Hugo von Orsbeck, Archbishop-elector (1676–1711)

Lower Rhenish–Westphalian

Bentheim-Alpen (complete list) –
Frederick Ludolph, Count (1606–1629)

Bentheim-Limburg (complete list) –
Conrad Gumbert, Count (1606–1632)

Bentheim-Bentheim (complete list) –
Philip Conrad, Count (1643–1668)
Arnold Maurice, Count (1668–1701)

Bentheim-Steinfurt (complete list) –
Arnold III, Count (1562–1606)
Arnold Jobst, Count (1606–1643)
William Henry, Count (1606–1632)
Frederick Ludolph, Count (1606–1629)
Conrad Gumbert, Count (1606–1618)
Ernest William, Count (1643–1693)
Ernest, Count (1693–1713)

Bentheim-Tecklenburg(-Rheda) (complete list, complete list) –
Arnold III, Count of Bentheim-Tecklenburg (1562–1606)
Adolf, Count of Bentheim-Tecklenburg-Rheda (1606–1623/25)
Maurice, Count of Bentheim-Tecklenburg-Rheda (1623/25–1674)
John Adolph, Count of Bentheim-Tecklenburg-Rheda (1674–1701/04)

Prince-Archbishopric of Bremen (complete list) –
John Frederick, Prince-archbishop (1596–1634)
Frederick II, Prince-archbishop (1635–1645)
Leopold William of Austria, Prince-archbishop (1635–1645)
Franz Wilhelm, Administrator (1645)
secularised into Duchy of Bremen, see Bremen-Verden

Duchy of Cleves, County of Mark (complete list, complete list) –
John William, Duke of Cleves, Count of Mark (1592–1609)
John Sigismund of Hohenzollern, Duke of Cleves, Count of Mark (1614–1619)
incorporated into Brandenburg

Princely Abbey of Corvey (de:complete list) –
Dietrich IV. von Beringhausen, Prince-abbot (1585–1616)
Heinrich V. von Aschenbrock, Prince-abbot (1616–1624)
Johann Christoph von Brambach, Prince-abbot (1624–1638)
, Prince-abbot (1638–1661)
Christoph Bernhard von Galen, Prince-abbot (1661–1678)
, Prince-abbot (1678–1696)
, Prince-abbot (1696–1714)

Essen Abbey (complete list) –
Margarete Elisabeth von Manderscheid-Blankenheim, Princess-Abbess (1598–1604)
Elisabeth IX von Bergh-s’Heerenberg, Princess-Abbess (1604–1614)
Maria Clara von Spaur, Pflaum und Vallier, Princess-Abbess (1614–1644)
Anna Eleonore von Stauffen, Princess-Abbess (1644–1645)
Anna Salome von Salm-Reifferscheid, Princess-Abbess (1646–1688)
Anna Salome of Manderscheid-Blankenheim, Princess-Abbess (1690–1691)
Bernhardine Sophia of East Frisia and Rietberg, Princess-Abbess (1691–1726)

County of East Frisia (complete list) –
Enno III, Count (1599–1625)
Rudolf Christian, Count (1625–1628)
Ulrich II, Count (1628–1648)
Juliana of Hesse-Darmstadt, Regent (1648–1651)
Enno Louis, Count (1651–1654), Prince (1654–1660)
George Christian, Prince (1660–1665)
Christian Everhard, Prince (1690–1708)

Herford Abbey (complete list) –
Magdalene I of Lippe, Abbess (1586–1604)
Felicitas II of Eberstein, Abbess (1604–1621)
Magdalene II of Lippe, Abbess (1621–1640)
Sidonia of Oldenburg, Abbess (1640–1649)
Maria Clara Theresa of Wartenberg, rival abbess 1629–1631
Elisabeth II, Abbess (1649–1667)
Elisabeth III, Abbess (1667–1680)
Elisabeth IV, Abbess (1680–1686)
Elisabeth V, Abbess (1686–1688)
Charlotte Sophia, Abbess (1688–1728)

Prince-Bishopric of Liège (complete list) –
Ernest of Bavaria, Prince-Bishop (1581–1612)
Ferdinand of Bavaria, Prince-Bishop (1612–1650)
Maximilian Henry of Bavaria, Prince-Bishop (1650–1688)
John Louis of Elderen, Prince-Bishop (1688–1694)
Joseph Clemens of Bavaria, Prince-Bishop (1694–1723)

Limburg-Styrum-Bronchhorst-Borkelö (complete list) –
Otto, Count (1644–1679)
George Albert, Count (1679–1690)
Frederick William, Count (1679–1724)

Limburg-Styrum-Gemen (complete list) –
Adolph Ernest, Count (1644–1657)
Herman Otto II, Count (1657–1704)

Limburg-Styrum-Iller-Aichheim (complete list) –
Maximilian William, Count (1657–1724)

Limburg-Styrum-Styrum (complete list) –
Moritz, Count (1644–1664)
Moritz Hermann, Count (1664–1703)

County of Lippe (complete list) –
Simon VI, Count (1563–1613)
Simon VII, Count (1613–1627)
Simon Ludwig, Count (1627–1636)
Simon Philipp, Count (1636–1650)
Johann Bernhard, Count (1650–1652)
Hermann Adolf, Count (1652–1666)
Simon Heinrich, Count (1666–1697)
Friedrich Adolf, Count (1697–1718)

Prince-Bishopric of Münster (complete list) –
Ernest of Bavaria, Prince-bishop (1585–1612)
Ferdinand I of Bavaria, Prince-bishop (1612–1650)
Bernhard von Galen, Prince-bishop (1650–1678)
Ferdinand II of Fürstenberg, Prince-bishop (1678–1683)
Maximilian Henry of Bavaria, Prince-bishop (1683–1688)
Frederick Christian of Plettenberg, Prince-bishop (1688–1706)

County of Oldenburg (complete list) –
John VII, Count (1573–1603)
Anthony II, Count of Oldenburg-Delmenhorst, Count (1573–1619)
Anthony Günther, Count (1603–1667)
Frederick I, Count (1667–1670)
Christian VIII, Count (1670–1699)
Frederick II, Count (1699–1730)

Prince-Bishopric of Osnabrück (complete list) –
Philip Sigismund, Prince-bishop (1591–1623)
Eitel Frederick, Prince-bishop (1623–1625)
Franz Wilhelm, Prince-bishop (1625–1634)
Gustav Gustavsson af Vasaborg, Prince-bishop (1634–1648)
Franz Wilhelm von Wartenberg, Prince-bishop (1648–1661)
Ernest Augustus, Prince-bishop (1662–1698)
Charles Joseph of Lorraine, Prince-bishop (1698–1715)

Prince-Bishopric of Paderborn (complete list) –
Dietrich IV, Bishop of Paderborn, Prince-bishop (1585–1618)
Ferdinand I of Bavaria, Prince-bishop (1618–1650)
, Prince-bishop (1650–1661)
Ferdinand II of Fürstenberg, Prince-bishop (1661–1683)
, Prince-bishop (1683–1704)

County of Sayn (complete list) –
Henry IV, co-Count (1560–1606)
Anna Elizabeth, Countess (1606–1608)

County of Schaumburg (complete list) –
, Count (1576–1601)
Ernest, Count (1601–1619), Prince (1619–1622)
Jobst Herman, Prince (1622–1635)
, Prince (1635–1640)

Prince-Bishopric of Verden (complete list) –
Frederick, Prince of Denmark, Prince-Bishop (1623–1629)
Francis William of Wartenberg, Prince-Bishop (1630–1631)
John Frederick of Schleswig-Holstein at Gottorp , Prince-Bishop (1631–1634)
Frederick of Denmark , Prince-Bishop (1635–1645)
rule by the Swedish occupants (1645–1648)
secularised to hereditary rule, see Bremen-Verden

County of Wied (complete list) –
William IV, co-Count (1581–1612)
Herman II, Count (1581–1631)
Frederick II, Count (1631–1698)
partitioned into Wied-Neuwied and Wied-Runkel

Wied-Dierdorf (complete list) –
John Ernest, Count (1631–1664)
Louis Frederick, Count (1664–1709)

Wied-Neuwied (complete list) –
Frederick William, Count (1698–1737)

Wied-Runkel (complete list) –
Johann Friederich Wilhelm, Count (1698–1699)
Maximilian Heinrich, Count (1692–1706)

Upper Rhenish

Prince-Bishopric of Basel (complete list) –
Jakob Christoph Blarer von Wartensee, Prince-bishop (1575–1608)
Wilhelm Rink von Baldenstein, Prince-bishop (1608–1628)
Johann Heinrich von Ostheim, Prince-bishop (1628–1646)
Beat Albrecht von Ramstein, Prince-bishop (1646–1651)
Johann Franz von Schönau-Zell, Prince-bishop (1651–1656)
Johann Konrad von Roggenbach, Prince-bishop (1656–1693)
Wilhelm Jakob Rink von Baldenstein, Prince-bishop (1693–1705)

Free City of Frankfurt
Senior Mayors (de:complete list) –
Johann Ludwig von Glauburg, Senior Mayor (1600–1601)
Johann Adolf Kellner, Senior Mayor (1601–1602)
Johann Philipp Völcker, Senior Mayor (1602–1603)
Hieronymus zum Jungen, Senior Mayor (1603–1604)
Johann von Melem, Senior Mayor (1604–1605)
Daniel Braumann, Senior Mayor (1605–1606)
Philipp Rücker, Senior Mayor (1606–1607)
Jacob am Steg, Senior Mayor (1607–1608)
Johann Adolf Kellner, Senior Mayor (1608–1609)
Hieronymus zum Jungen, Senior Mayor (1609–1610)
Nicolaus Ulrich Faust von Aschaffenburg, Senior Mayor (1610–1611)
Christoph Ludwig Völcker, Senior Mayor (1611–1612)
Jacob am Steg, Senior Mayor (1612–1613)
, Senior Mayor (1613–1614)
, Senior Mayor (1614–1615)
Philipp Ludwig Fleischbein, Senior Mayor (1615–1616)
Johann Adolf Kellner, Senior Mayor (1616–1617)
Georg Sand, Senior Mayor (1617–1618)
Daniel von Stalburg, Senior Mayor (1618–1619)
Johann Hector zum Jungen, Senior Mayor (1619–1620)
Johann Bebinger, Senior Mayor (1620–1621)
Achilles von Hynsperg, Senior Mayor (1621–1622)
Hieronymus Steffan von Cronstetten, Senior Mayor (1622–1623)
Johann Philipp Weiß von Limpurg, Senior Mayor (1623–1624)
Johann Ulrich von Neuhaus, Senior Mayor (1624–1625)
Johann Philipp Orth, Senior Mayor (1625–1626)
Achilles von Hynsperg, Senior Mayor (1626–1627)
Hieronymus Steffan von Cronstetten, Senior Mayor (1627–1628)
Jeremias Orth, Senior Mayor (1628–1629)
Johann Ludwig von Glauburg, Senior Mayor (1629–1630)
Johann Philipp Weiß von Limpurg, Senior Mayor (1630–1631)
, Senior Mayor (1631–1632)
Thomas Diller, Senior Mayor (1632–1633)
Johann Jacob Jeckel, Senior Mayor (1633–1634)
Johann Schwind, Senior Mayor (1634–1635)
Hieronymus von Stalburg, Senior Mayor (1635–1636)
Johann Maximilian Kellner, Senior Mayor (1636–1637)
, Senior Mayor (1637–1638)
Hector Wilhelm von Günderrode, Senior Mayor (1638–1639)
Johann Heinrich zum Jungen, Senior Mayor (1639–1640)
Johann Schwind, Senior Mayor (1640–1641)
Hieronymus von Stalburg, Senior Mayor (1641–1642)
Caspar Philipp Fleischbein, Senior Mayor (1642–1643)
Johann Maximilian zum Jungen, Senior Mayor (1643–1644)
Oyer Christoph Völcker, Senior Mayor (1644–1645)
, Senior Mayor (1645–1646)
Hieronymus von Stalburg, Senior Mayor (1646–1647)
, Senior Mayor (1647–1648)
Johann Christoph Kellner, Senior Mayor (1648–1649)
Erasmus Seiffart, Senior Mayor (1649–1650)
Vincenz Steinmeyer, Senior Mayor (1650–1651)
Philipp Christian Uffsteiner, Senior Mayor (1651–1652)
Adolf Steffan von Cronstetten, Senior Mayor (1652–1653)
Oyer Christoph Völcker, Senior Mayor (1653–1654)
Johann Christoph Bender von Bienenthal, Senior Mayor (1654–1655)
Erasmus Seiffart, Senior Mayor (1655–1656)
Adolf Steffan von Cronstetten, Senior Mayor (1656–1657)
Johann Christoph Bender von Bienenthal, Senior Mayor (1657–1658)
Vincenz Steinmeyer, Senior Mayor (1658–1659)
Erasmus Seiffart, Senior Mayor (1659–1660)
Hand Georg Grambs, Senior Mayor (1660–1661)
Johann Christoph Bender von Bienenthal, Senior Mayor (1661–1662)
Adolf Steffan von Cronstetten, Senior Mayor (1662–1663)
Johann Hector von Holzhausen, Senior Mayor (1663–1664)
Johann Conrad Cless, Senior Mayor (1664–1665)
Hieronymus Peter von Stetten, Senior Mayor (1665–1666)
Daniel Weitz, Senior Mayor (1666–1667)
Philipp Christian Lersner, Senior Mayor (1667–1668)
, Senior Mayor (1668–1669)
Johann Philipp Fleischbein, Senior Mayor (1669–1670)
, Senior Mayor (1670–1671)
Heinrich Wilhelm Kellner, Senior Mayor (1671–1672)
Johann Jacob Baur von Eysseneck, Senior Mayor (1672–1673)
Johann Conrad Cless, Senior Mayor (1673–1674)
Daniel Weitz, Senior Mayor (1674–1675)
Philipp Christian Lersner, Senior Mayor (1675–1676)
Anton Christian Mohr von Mohrenhelm, Senior Mayor (1676–1677)
Heinrich Wilhelm Kellner, Senior Mayor (1677–1678)
Johann Jacob Baur von Eysseneck, Senior Mayor (1678–1679)
Philipp Wilhelm von Günderrode, Senior Mayor (1679–1680)
Johann Daniel von Stalburg, Senior Mayor (1680–1681)
Philipp Christian Lersner, Senior Mayor (1681–1682)
Heinrich Wilhelm Kellner, Senior Mayor (1682–1683)
Johann Jacob Baur von Eysseneck, Senior Mayor (1683–1684)
Johann Daniel von Stalburg, Senior Mayor (1683–1684)
Johann Daniel von Stalburg, Senior Mayor (1684–1685)
Philipp Wilhelm von Günderrode, Senior Mayor (1684–1685)
Johann Daniel von Stalburg, Senior Mayor (1685–1686)
Philipp Ludwig Ort, Senior Mayor (1687–1688)
Adolf Ernst Humbracht, Senior Mayor (1688–1689)
Johann Thomas Eberhard gen. Schwind, Senior Mayor (1689–1690)
Johann Friedericii, Senior Mayor (1690–1691)
Johann Erasmus Seiffart von Klettenberg, Senior Mayor (1691–1692)
Heinrich Ludwig Lersner, Senior Mayor (1692–1693)
Balthasar von Kayb, Senior Mayor (1693–1694)
Johann Jacob Müller, Senior Mayor (1694–1695)
Philipp Heinrich Schad, Senior Mayor (1695–1696)
Johann Hector von Holzhausen, Senior Mayor (1696–1697)
Johann Adolf von Glauburg, Senior Mayor (1697–1698)
Philipp Nicolaus Lersner, Senior Mayor (1699–1700)
Heinrich von Barckhausen, Senior Mayor (1700–1701)
Stadtschultheißens (de:complete list) –
, Stadtschultheißen (1614–1615)
, Stadtschultheißen (1616–1634)
Johann Erasmus Seyffart von Klettenberg und Rhoda, Stadtschultheißen (1696–1716)

Princely Abbey of Fulda (complete list) –
Julius Echter von Mespelbrunn, Administrator (1576–1602)
Johann Friedrich von Schwalbach, Prince-abbot (1606–1622)
, Prince-abbot (1623–1632)
Johann Adolf von Hoheneck, Prince-abbot (1633–1635)
, Prince-abbot (1635–1644)
, Prince-abbot (1644–1671)
Bernhard Gustav of Baden-Durlach, Prince-abbot (1671–1677)
, Prince-abbot (1678–1700)
, Prince-abbot (1700–1714)

Hesse-Butzbach (complete list) –
Philip III, Landgrave of Hesse-Butzbach (1609–1643)

Hesse-Braubach (complete list) –
John, Landgrave (1626–1651)

Hesse-Darmstadt (complete list) –
Louis VI the Faithful, Landgrave (1596–1626)
George II, Landgrave (1626–1661)
Louis VI, Landgrave (1661–1678)
Louis VII, Landgrave (1678)
Elisabeth Dorothea of Saxe-Gotha-Altenburg, Regent (1678–1688)
Ernest Louis, Landgrave (1678–1739)

Hesse-Eschwege (complete list) –
Frederick II, Landgrave (1632–1655)
Ernest I, Landgrave of Hesse-Rheinfels (1649–1693), of Hesse-Eschwege (1655–1667), of Hesse-Rotenburg (1658–1693)

Hesse-Homburg (complete list) –
Frederick I, Landgrave (1622–1638)
Margaret Elisabeth of Leiningen-Westerburg, Regent (1638–1648)
William Christoph, Landgrave (1643–1669)
George Christian, Landgrave (1669–1671)
Frederick II, Landgrave (1679–1708)

Hesse-Itter (complete list) –
George III, Landgrave (1661–1676)

Hesse-Kassel (complete list) –
Maurice I the Learned, Landgrave (1592–1627)
William V the Stable, Landgrave (1627–1637)
Amalie Elisabeth of Hanau-Münzenberg, Regent (1637–1650)
William VI, Landgrave (1637–1663)
Hedwig Sophie of Brandenburg, Regent (1663–1677)
William VII, Landgrave (1663–1670)
Charles I, Landgrave (1670–1730)

Hesse-Marburg –
Louis IV the Elder, Landgrave (1567–1604)

Hesse-Philippsthal (complete list) –
Philip, Landgrave (1663–1721)

Hesse-Rheinfels (complete list) –
Ernest I, Landgrave of Hesse-Rheinfels (1649–1693), of Hesse-Eschwege (1655–1667), of Hesse-Rotenburg (1658–1693)

Hesse-Rotenburg (complete list) –
Herman IV, Landgrave (1627–1658)
Ernest I, Landgrave of Hesse-Rheinfels (1649–1693), of Hesse-Eschwege (1655–1667), of Hesse-Rotenburg (1658–1693)
William the Elder, Landgrave (1693–1725)

Hesse-Wanfried-Rheinfels (complete list) –
Charles, Landgrave (1676–1711)

Isenburg-Birstein (complete list) –
William Otto, Count (1628–1635)
Wolfgang Ernest II, Count (1635–1641)
Christian Maurice, Count (1635–1664)
John Louis, Count (1641–1664)

Isenburg-Büdingen (complete list) –
Wolfgang Ernst I. von Isenburg-Büdingen, Count (1596–1633)
Johann Ernst I. von Isenburg-Büdingen, Count (1633–1673)
Johann Casimir von Isenburg und Büdingen, Count (1673–1693)
Johann Ernst II. von Isenburg und Büdingen, Count (1693–1708)

Isenburg-Büdingen-Birstein (complete list) –
Wolfgang Henry, Count (1633–1635)
Johann Ludwig, Count (1635–1685)
Wilhelm Moritz I, Count (1685–1711)

Isenburg-Grenzau (complete list) –
Salentin VII, Count (1577–1610)
Salentin VIII, Count (1610–1619)
Ernest, Count (1619–1664)

Isenburg-Offenbach (complete list) –
Wolfgang Henry, Count (1628–1635)
John Louis, Count (1635–1685)
John Philip, Count (1685–1711)
Christian Henry, Count (1685–1711)

Isenburg-Meerholz (complete list) –
George Albert, Count (1691–1724)

Isenburg-Wächtersbach –
Ferdinand Maximilian I, Count (1673–1703)

Westerburg-Leiningen-Leiningen  (complete list: de) –
Louis, Count (1597–1622)
John Casimir, Count (1622–1635)
John Louis, Count (1635–1665)
Philipp II, Count of Leiningen-Rixingen (1622–1665), of Leiningen-Leiningen (1665–1668)
Ludwig Eberhard, Count (1668)
Philipp Ludwig, Count of Leiningen-Leiningen (1668–1705)

Leiningen-Dagsburg-Falkenburg – 
Emich X, Count of Leiningen-Dagsburg (1541–1593)
Johann Ludwig, Count (1593–1625)
Emich XIII, Count (1625–1658)
George William, Count (1658–1672)
Johann, Count (1672–1698)
Christian Karl Reinhard, Count (1698–1766)

Leiningen-Oberbronn (de:complete list) –
Louis Emich, Count (1622–1635)

Leiningen-Rixingen (de:complete list) –
Philipp II, Count of Leiningen-Rixingen (1622–1665), of Leiningen-Leiningen (1665–1668)

Westerburg-Leiningen-Leiningen  (complete list: de) –
Philipp Ludwig, Count of Leiningen-Leiningen (1668–1705)

Leiningen-Schaumburg (de:complete list) –
Philipp Jacob, Count (1586–1612)
Reinhard II, Count (1586–1655)
Christopher, Count (1586–1635)
Philipp Ludwig, Count (1635–1637)
George Wilhelm, Count (1635–1695)
Johann Anton, Count (1695–1698)
George Friedrich, Count (1698–1708)

Leiningen-Westerburg-Altleiningen (de:complete list) –
Christopher Christian, Count (1695–1728)

Leiningen-Westerburg-Neuleiningen (de:complete list) –
George II Karl Ludwig, Count (1695–1726)

Leiningen-Hardenburg (de:complete list) –
Emich XII, Count (1562–1607)
Johann Philipp II, Count (1607–1643)
Friedrich Emich, Count (1643–1698)
Emich XIV, Count (?–1684)
Johann Friedrich, Count (1684–1722)

Duchy of Lorraine (complete list) –
Charles III, Duke (1545–1608)
Henry II, Duke (1608–1624)
Nicole, Duchess suo jure (1624–1625)
Francis II, Duke (1625)
Charles IV, Duke (1625–1634, 1661–1675)
Nicholas II, Duke (1634–1661)
Charles V, Duke (1675–1690)
Leopold, Duke (1690–1729)

County of Nassau-Saarbrücken (complete list) –
Philip IV, Count (1574–1602)
Louis II, Count (1602–1627)
William Louis, Count (1625/27–1640)
Crato, Count (1640–1642)
John Louis, Count (1642–1659)
Gustav Adolph, Count (1642–1677)
Louis Crato, Count (1677–1713)

Nassau-Usingen (complete list) –
Walrad, Count (1659–1688), Prince (1688–1702)

Nassau-Weilburg (complete list) –
Philip IV, Count (1559–1602)
Louis II, Count (1593–1625)
William Louis, co-Count (1625–1629), Count of Nassau-Saarbrücken (1629–1640)
John IV, co-Count (1625–1629), Count of Nassau-Idstein (1629–1677)
Ernst Casimir, co-Count (1625–1629), Count (1629–1655)
Frederick, Count (1655–1675)
John Ernst, Count (1675–1688), Princely count (1688–1719)

Lower Salm (complete list) –
Werner, Count (1559–1629)
Ernst Frederick, Altgrave (1629–1639)

Salm-Dhaun (complete list) –
Adolf Henry, Rhinegrave (1574–1606)
Wolfgang Frederick, Rhinegrave  (1606–1638)
John Louis, Rhinegrave (1638–1673)
John Philip II, Rhinegrave (1673–1693)
Charles, Rhinegrave (1693–1733)

Salm-Hoogstraten (complete list) –
William Florentin, Rhinegrave (1696–1707)

Salm-Leuze (complete list) –
Henry Gabriel, Rhinegrave (1696–1716)

Salm-Neuweiler (complete list) –
Frederick I, Rhinegrave (1561–1610)
Frederick II, Rhinegrave (1610–1673)
Charles Florentin, Rhinegrave (1673–1676)
Frederick Charles, Rhinegrave (1676–1696)

Salm-Püttlingen (complete list) –
Vollrath Victor, Rhinegrave (1697–1730)

Salm-Reifferscheid-Bedburg (complete list) –	
Erik Adolf, Altgrave (1639–1673)
Francis William, Altgrave (1673–1734)

Salm-Reifferscheid-Dyck (complete list) –
Ernest Salentin, Altgrave (1639–1684)
Francis Ernest, Altgrave (1684–1721)

Salm-Salm (complete list) –
Friedrich I, Count (1574–1608)
Philipp Otto, Count of Salm-Salm (1608–1634), Prince of Salm (1623–1634)
Ludwig, Prince of Salm, Count of Salm-Salm (1634–1636)
Leopold Philipp Karl, Prince of Salm, Count of Salm-Salm (1636–1663)
Charles Theodore, Prince of Salm, Count of Salm-Salm (1663–1710)

Sayn-Wittgenstein-Berleburg (complete list) –
Georg V, Count (1607–1631)
Ludwig Casimir, Count (1631–1643)
Georg Wilhelm, Count (1643–1684)
Ludwig Franz, Count (1684–1694)
Casimir, Count (1694–1741)

Sayn-Wittgenstein-Hohenstein (complete list) –
Gustav, Count (1657–1701)

Prince-Bishopric of Sion (complete list) –
Hildebrand I of Riedmatten, Prince-Bishop (1565–1604)
Adrien II of Riedmatten, Prince-Bishop (1604–1613)
Hildebrand II Jost, Prince-Bishop (1613–1638)
Barthélemy Supersaxo, Prince-Bishop (1638–1640)
Adrien III of Riedmatten, Prince-Bishop (1640–1646)
Adrien IV of Riedmatten, Prince-Bishop (1646–1672)
Adrien V of Riedmatten, Prince-Bishop (1672–1701)

Solms-Braunfels (complete list) –
Johann Albrecht I, Count (1592–1623)
Konrad Ludwig, Count (1623–1635)
Johann Albrecht II, Count (1635–1647)
Heinrich Trajectinus, Count (1648–1693)
Wilhelm Moritz, Count (1693–1720)

Prince-Bishopric of Speyer (complete list) –
Eberhard of Dienheim, Prince-bishop (1581–1610)
Philipp Christoph von Sötern, Prince-bishop (1610–1652)
Lothar Friedrich of Metternich, Prince-bishop (1652–1675)
Johann Hugo von Orsbeck, Prince-bishop (1675–1711)

Prince-Bishopric of Strasbourg (complete list) –
Johann Georg von Brandenburg, Prince-Bishop (1592–1604)
Charles of Lorraine, Prince-Bishop (1592/1604–1607)
Leopold V, Archduke of Austria, Prince-Bishop (1607–1626)
Leopold William, Archduke of Austria, Prince-Bishop (1626–1662)
Francis Egon of Fürstenberg, Prince-Bishop (1663–1682)
Wilhelm Egon von Fürstenberg, Prince-Bishop (1682–1704)

County of Waldeck-Eisenberg –
Christian, Count of Waldeck-Eisenberg (1588–1607), of Waldeck-Wildungen (1607–1637)
Wolrad IV, Count of Waldeck-Eisenberg (1588–1607), Newer Line (1607–1640)
Philip Dietrich, Count (1640–1645)
Henry Wolrad, Count (1645–1664)
Georg Friedrich, Count (1664–1692)

County of Waldeck-Wildungen/ County of Waldeck and Pyrmont –
Christian, Count of Waldeck-Eisenberg (1588–1607), of Waldeck-Wildungen (1607–1637)
Philip VII, Count (1638–1645)
Josias II, co-Count (1645–1669)
Christian Louis,  Count of Waldeck-Wildungen (1645–1692), of Waldeck and Pyrmont (1692–1706)

Prince-Bishopric of Worms (complete list) –
Philipp von Rothenstein, Prince-bishop (1595–1604)
Philipp II. Kratz von Scharfenstein, Prince-bishop (1604)
Wilhelm von Essern, Prince-bishop (1604–1616)
Georg Friedrich von Greiffenklau, Prince-bishop (1616–1629)
Georg Anton von Rodenstein, Prince-bishop (1629–1652)
Hugo Eberhard Kratz von Scharfenstein, Prince-bishop (1654–1663)
Johann Philipp von Schönborn, Prince-bishop (1663–1673)
Lothar Friedrich von Metternich-Burscheid, Prince-bishop (1673–1675)
Damian Hartard von der Leyen-Hohengeroldseck, Prince-bishop (1675–1678)
Karl Heinrich von Metternich-Winneburg, Prince-bishop (1679)
Franz Emmerich Kaspar von Waldbott von Bassenheim, Prince-bishop (1679–1683)
Johannes Karl von und zu Franckenstein, Prince-bishop (1683–1691)
Ludwig Anton von Pfalz-Neuburg, Prince-bishop (1691–1694)
Count Palatine Francis Louis of Neuburg, Prince-bishop (1694–1732)

Lower Saxon

Electorate of Saxony, Albertine (complete list) –
Christian II, Elector (1591–1611), Regent of Saxe-Altenburg (1603–1611) 
John George I, Elector (1611–1656), Regent of Saxe-Altenburg (1611–1618)
John George II, Elector (1656–1680), Regent of Saxe-Altenburg (1669–1672)
John George III, Elector (1680–1691)
John George IV, Elector (1691–1694)
Augustus II the Strong, Elector (1694–1733), Regent of Saxe-Merseburg (1694–1712)

Saxe-Lauenburg (complete list) –
Augustus, co-Vicegerent (1578–1581), co-Administrator (1581–1586), co-Duke (1586–1612)
Francis II, co-Vicegerent (1578–1581), co-Administrator (1581–1586), co-Duke (1586–1619)
Augustus, Duke (1619–1656)
Julius Henry, Duke (1656–1665)
Francis Erdmann, Duke (1665–1666)
Julius Francis, Duke (1666–1689)
George William, occupying Duke (1689–1705)
title then held successively by the monarchs of Britain, Denmark, and Prussia

Saxe-Merseburg (complete list) –
Christian I, Duke (1657–1691)
Christian II, Duke (1691–1694)
Christian III Maurice, Duke (1694)
Augustus II the Strong, Elector (1694–1733), Regent of Saxe-Merseburg (1694–1712)
Erdmuthe Dorothea of Saxe-Zeitz, Regent (1694–1712)
Maurice William, Duke (1694–1731)

Saxe-Weissenfels (complete list) –
Augustus I, Duke (1657–1680)
Johann Adolf I, Duke (1680–1697)
Johann Georg, Duke (1697–1712)

Saxe-Zeitz (complete list) –
Maurice I, Duke (1657–1681)
Moritz Wilhelm, Duke (1681–1718)

Saxe-Zeitz-Pegau-Neustadt (complete list) –
Frederick Henry, Duke of Saxe-Zeitz-Pegau-Neustadt, Duke (1699–1713)
inherited by the Electorate of Saxony

Prince-Archbishopric of Bremen (complete list) –
John Frederick, Prince-archbishop (1596–1634)
Frederick II, Prince-archbishop (1635–1645)
Leopold William of Austria, Prince-archbishop (1635–1645)
Franz Wilhelm, Administrator (1645)
converted into Duchy of Bremen, see Bremen-Verden

Bremen-Verden (complete list) –
Christina, Duchess (1648–1654)
Charles X Gustav, Duke (1654–1660)
Charles XI, Duke (1660–1697)
Charles XII, Duke (1697–1718)

Free City of Bremen (complete list) –
Mayors Heinrich Lampe I (1745–1756)

Principality of Brunswick-Wolfenbüttel/ Principality of Wolfenbüttel (complete list) –
Henry Julius, Prince of Wolfenbüttel, of Calenberg (1589–1613), of Grubenhagen (1596–1613)
Frederick Ulrich, Prince of Brunswick-Wolfenbüttel, of Calenberg (1613–1634), of Calenberg (1613–1617)
Augustus the Younger, Prince (1635–1666)
Rudolf Augustus, Prince (1666–1704)
Anthony Ulrich, Prince (1685–1702, 1704–1714)

Principality of Calenberg (complete list) –
Henry Julius, Prince of Wolfenbüttel, of Calenberg (1589–1613), of Grubenhagen (1596–1613)
Frederick Ulrich, Prince of Brunswick-Wolfenbüttel, of Calenberg (1613–1634), of Calenberg (1613–1617)
George, Prince (1635–1641)
Christian Louis, Prince of Calenberg (1641–1648), of Lüneburg (1648–1665)
George William, Prince of Calenberg (1648–1665), of Lüneburg (1658–1705)
John Frederick, Prince (1665–1679)
Ernest Augustus, Prince (1679–1698), Elector-designate (1692–1698)

Gandersheim Abbey (complete list) –
Anna Erica, Princess-Abbess (1589–1611)
Dorothea Augusta, Princess-Abbess (1611–1626)
Catharina Elisabeth, Princess-Abbess (?)
Maria Sabina, Princess-Abbess (1650–1665)
Dorothea Hedwig, Princess-Abbess (1665–1678)
Christine Sophie, Princess-Abbess (1678–1681)
Christina II, Princess-Abbess (1681–1693)
Henriette Christine, Princess-Abbess (1693–1712)

Electorate of Hanover (Brunswick-Lüneburg) (complete list) –
Ernest Augustus, Prince (1679–1698), Elector-designate (1692–1698)
George I, Elector-designate (1698–1708), Elector (1708–1727)

Free City of Hamburg (complete list) –
Eberhard Twestreng, Mayor (1606)
Hieronimus Vögeler, Mayor (1609)
Mayorship unoccupied (1613–1614), Hieronymus Vögeler, Second Mayor (1609–1642)
Sebastian von Bergen, Mayor (1614–1623)
Johann Wetken:, Mayor (1614)
Bartholomäus Beckmann, Mayor (1617)
Joachim Claen, Mayor (1622)
Albert von Eitzen, Mayor (1623)
unoccupied, Mayor (1623–1624)
Ulrich Winkel, Mayor (1624–1649)
Johannes Brand, Mayor (1633–1652)
Bartholomäus Moller, Mayor (1643)
Mayorship unoccupied (1649–1650), Bartholomäus Moller, Second Mayor (1643–1667)
Nicolaus Jarre, Mayor (1650–1678)
Johann Schlebusch, Mayor (1653)
Peter Lütkens, Mayor (1654)
Wolfgang Meurer, Mayor (1660)
Bartholomäus Twestreng, Mayor (1663)
Johannes Schötteringk, Mayor (1667)
Johann Schulte, Mayor (1668)
Bruderus Pauli, Mayor (1670–1680)
Johann Schröder, Mayor (1676)
Heinrich Meurer, Mayor (1678–1684)
Diedrich Moller, Mayor (1680)
Johann Schlüter, Mayor (1684–1688)
Joachim Lemmermann, Mayor (1684)
Heinrich Meurer, Mayor (1686)
Peter Lütkens, Mayor (1687–1717)
Johannes Schafshausen, Mayor (1690–1697)
Hieronimus Harticus Moller, Mayor (1697)
Peter von Lengerke (or Lengerks), Mayor (1697–1709)

Prince-Bishopric of Hildesheim (complete list) –
Ernest II of Bavaria, Prince-bishop (1573–1612)
Ferdinand of Bavaria, Administrator (1612–1650)
Maximilian Henry of Bavaria, Prince-bishop (1650–1688)
, Prince-bishop (1688–1702)

Holstein-Glückstadt
Dukes (complete list) –
Christian IV, Duke (1588–1648)
Frederick III, Duke (1648–1670)
Christian V, Duke (1670–1699)
Frederick IV, Duke (1699–1730)
Christian VII, Duke of Holstein-Glückstadt (1766–1773), of Holstein (1773–1808)
Statholders (complete list) –
Geerd Rantzau, Statholder (1600–1627)
Prince Frederick of Denmark, Statholder (1647–1648)
Christian zu Rantzau, Statholder (1648–1663)
Friedrich von Ahlefeldt, Statholder (1663–1685)
Detlev zu Rantzau, Statholder (1685–1697)
Friedrich von Ahlefeldt, Statholder (1697–1708)

Holstein-Gottorp (complete list) –
John Adolf, Duke (1590–1616)
Frederick III, Duke (1616–1659)
Christian Albert, Duke (1659–1694)
Frederick IV, Duke (1694–1702)

Holstein-Pinneberg (Holstein-Schaumburg) (complete list) –
, Count (1576–1601)
Ernest, Count (1601–1622)
Jobst Herman, Count (1622–1635)
, Count (1635–1640)

Prince-bishopric of Lübeck (complete list) –
John Adolf, Duke of Holstein-Gottorp, Prince-bishop (1586–1607)
John Frederick of Holstein-Gottorp, Prince-bishop (1607–1634)
John X of Schleswig-Holstein-Gottorp, Prince-bishop (1634–1655)
Christian Albert, Duke of Holstein-Gottorp, Prince-bishop (1655–1666)
August Frederick of Holstein-Gottorp, Prince-bishop (1666–1705)

Free City of Lübeck (complete list) –
Jakob Bording, Mayor (1600–1616)
, Mayor (1601–1612)
, Mayor (1609–1623)
, Mayor (1619–1630)
, Mayor (1612–1634)
, Mayor (1616–1620)
, Mayor (1624–1641)
, Mayor (1627–1661)
, Mayor (1634–1639)
, Mayor (1630–1651)
, Mayor (1640–1652)
, Mayor (1651–1665)
, Mayor (1654–1669)
, Mayor (1642–1657)
, Mayor (1659–1667)
, Mayor (1663–1668)
, Mayor (1667–1677)
, Mayor (1671–1693)
, Mayor (1669–1700)
, Mayor (1680–1682)
, Mayor (1666–1671)
, Mayor (1687–1696)
, Mayor (1669–1686)
, Mayor (1685–1688)
, Mayor (1692–1694)
, Mayor (1694–1707)
, Mayor (1695–1704)
, Mayor (1697–1705)

Principality of Lüneburg (complete list) –
Ernest II, Prince (1592–1611)
Christian, Prince of Lüneburg (1611–1633), of Grubenhagen (1617)
Augustus the Elder, Prince (1633–1636)
Frederick IV, Prince (1636–1648)
Christian Louis, Prince of Calenberg (1641–1648), of Lüneburg (1648–1665)
George William, Prince of Calenberg (1648–1665), of Lüneburg (1658–1705)

Prince-Archbishopric of Magdeburg and of Halberstadt (complete list) –
Christian William of Brandenburg, Prince-archbishop (1598–1631)
Leopold William of Austria, Administrator (1631–1638)
Augustus, Duke of Saxe-Weissenfels, Prince-archbishop (1638–1680)
secularised into the Duchy of Magdeburg

Duchy of Mecklenburg-Güstrow (complete list) –
Ulrich I, Duke (1555–1603)
Charles I, Duke of Mecklenburg-Güstrow (1603–1610), Regent of Mecklenburg-Schwerin (1608–1610)
Adolf Frederick I, co-Duke of Mecklenburg-Schwerin (1592–1621), -Güstrow (1610–1621), Duke of Mecklenburg-Schwerin (1621–1628, 1631–1658)
John Albert II, co-Duke of Mecklenburg-Schwerin (1592–1621), -Güstrow (1610–1621), Duke of Mecklenburg-Güstrow (1621–1628, 1631–1636)
Albrecht von Wallenstein, military leader (1628–1631)
Gustav Adolph I, Duke (1636–1695)
inherited by Mecklenburg-Schwerin to unite Mecklenburg

Duchy of Mecklenburg-Schwerin (complete list) –
John Albert II, co-Duke of Mecklenburg-Schwerin (1592–1621), -Güstrow (1610–1621), Duke of Mecklenburg-Güstrow (1621–1628, 1631–1636)
Adolf Frederick I, co-Duke of Mecklenburg-Schwerin (1592–1621), -Güstrow (1610–1621), Duke of Mecklenburg-Schwerin (1621–1628, 1631–1658)
Albrecht von Wallenstein, military leader (1628–1631)
Christian Louis I, Duke (1658–1692)
Frederick William I, Duke of Mecklenburg-Schwerin (1692–1695, 1701–1713), Duke of Mecklenburg (1695–1701)

Mecklenburg (complete list) –
Frederick William I, Duke of Mecklenburg-Schwerin (1692–1695, 1701–1713), Duke of Mecklenburg (1695–1701)

County of Oldenburg (complete list) –
John VII, Count (1573–1603)
Anthony II, Count (1573–1619)
Anthony Günther, Count (1603–1667)
Frederick I, Count (1667–1670)
Christian VIII, Count (1670–1699)
Frederick II, Count (1699–1730)

County of Rantzau –
, Count (1653/54–1663)
Detlev of Rantzau, Count (1663–1697)
, Count (1697–1721)

Upper Saxon

Principality of Anhalt (complete list) –
John Ernest, co-Prince of Anhalt (1586–1601)
John George I, co-Prince of Anhalt (1586–1603), of Anhalt-Dessau (1603–1618)
Rudolph II, co-Prince of Anhalt (1586–1603), of Anhalt-Zerbst (1603–1621)
Christian I, co-Prince of Anhalt (1586–1603), of Anhalt-Bernburg (1603–1630)
Louis I, co-Prince of Anhalt (1586–1603), of Anhalt-Köthen (1603–1650)
Augustus, co-Prince of Anhalt (1586–1603), of Anhalt-Plötzkau (1603–1653), Regent of Anhalt-Zerbst (1621–1642), of Anhalt-Köthen (1650–1653)

Anhalt-Bernburg (complete list) –
Christian I, co-Prince of Anhalt (1586–1603), of Anhalt-Bernburg (1603–1630)
Christian II, Prince (1630–1656)
Victor Amadeus, Prince (1656–1718)

Anhalt-Dessau (complete list) –
John George I, co-Prince of Anhalt (1586–1603), of Anhalt-Dessau (1603–1618)
John Casimir, Prince (1618–1660)
John George II, Prince of Anhalt-Dessau (1660–1693), Regent of Anhalt-Köthen (1690–1692)
Henriette Catherine of Nassau, Regent of Anhalt-Dessau (1693–1698)
Leopold I, Prince (1693–1747)

Anhalt-Dornburg (complete list) –
John Louis I, Prince (1667–1704)

Anhalt-Köthen (complete list) –
Louis I, co-Prince of Anhalt (1586–1603), of Anhalt-Köthen (1603–1650)
Augustus, co-Prince of Anhalt (1586–1603), of Anhalt-Plötzkau (1603–1653), Regent of Anhalt-Zerbst (1621–1642), of Anhalt-Köthen (1650–1653)
William Louis, Prince (1650–1665)
Lebrecht, co-Regent of Anhalt-Köthen (1653–1659), co-Prince of Anhalt-Plötzkau (1653–1665), of Anhalt-Köthen (1665–1669)
Emmanuel, co-Regent of Anhalt-Köthen (1653–1659), co-Prince of Anhalt-Plötzkau (1653–1665), of Anhalt-Köthen (1665–1670)
Anna Eleonore of Stolberg-Wernigerode, Regent of Anhalt-Köthen (1670–1690)
John George II, Prince of Anhalt-Dessau (1660–1693), Regent of Anhalt-Köthen (1690–1692)
Emmanuel Lebrecht, Prince (1671–1704)

Anhalt-Plötzkau (complete list) –
Augustus, co-Prince of Anhalt (1586–1603), of Anhalt-Plötzkau (1603–1653), Regent of Anhalt-Zerbst (1621–1642), of Anhalt-Köthen (1650–1653)
Ernest Gottlieb, Prince of Anhalt-Plötzkau (1653–1654)
Lebrecht, co-Regent of Anhalt-Köthen (1653–1659), co-Prince of Anhalt-Plötzkau (1653–1665), of Anhalt-Köthen (1665–1669)
Emmanuel, co-Regent of Anhalt-Köthen (1653–1659), co-Prince of Anhalt-Plötzkau (1653–1665), of Anhalt-Köthen (1665–1670)

Anhalt-Zerbst (complete list) –
Rudolph II, co-Prince of Anhalt (1586–1603), of Anhalt-Zerbst (1603–1621)
Augustus, co-Prince of Anhalt (1586–1603), of Anhalt-Plötzkau (1603–1653), Regent of Anhalt-Zerbst (1621–1642), of Anhalt-Köthen (1650–1653)
John VI, Prince (1621–1667)
Sophie Augusta of Holstein-Gottorp, Regent (1667–1674)
Charles, Prince (1667–1718)

Electorate of Brandenburg (complete list) –
Joachim Frederick, Elector (1598–1608)
John Sigismund, Elector of Brandenburg (1608–1619), Duke of Prussia (1618–1619)

Brandenburg-Prussia: Electorate of Brandenburg and Duchy of Prussia (complete list, complete list) –
John Sigismund, Elector of Brandenburg (1608–1619), Duke of Prussia (1618–1619)
George William, Elector, Duke (1619–1640)
Frederick William, Elector (1640–1688)
Frederick I, Elector (1688–1713), Duke (1688–1701), King (1701–1713)

Pomerania-Wolgast (complete list) –
Philip Julius, Duke of Pomerania-Wolgast (1592–1625)
then inherited by Bogislaw XIV the Sociable to unite Pomerania

Pomerania-Stettin, Duchy of Pomerania, Pomerania-Barth (complete list) –
Barnim X the Younger, co-Duke of Pomerania-Wolgast (1560–1569), Duke of Pomerania-Rügenwalde (1569–1603), of Pomerania-Stettin (1600–1603)
Bogislaw XIII, co-Duke of Pomerania-Wolgast (1560–1569), co-Duke of Pomerania-Barth (1569–1603), of Pomerania-Stettin (1603–1606)
Philip II the Pious, Duke of Pomerania-Stettin (1606–1618)
Francis, Duke of Pomerania-Barth (1606–1620), of Pomerania-Stettin (1618–1620)
Bogislaw XII the Sociable, Duke of Pomerania-Rügenwalde (1617–1625), of Pomerania-Stettin (1620–1625), of Pomerania (1625–1637)

Pomerania-Rügenwalde, Duchy of Pomerania (complete list) –
Barnim X the Younger, co-Duke of Pomerania-Wolgast (1560–1569), Duke of Pomerania-Rügenwalde (1569–1603), of Pomerania-Stettin (1600–1603)
George II, Duke of Pomerania-Rügenwalde (1603–1617)
Bogislaw XII the Sociable, Duke of Pomerania-Rügenwalde (1617–1625), of Pomerania-Stettin (1620–1625), of Pomerania (1625–1637)

Reuss-Ebersdorf (complete list) –
Heinrich X, Count (1678–1711)

Reuss-Lobenstein (complete list) –
Henry X, Lord (1647–1671)
Heinrich V, Lord (1671–1672)
Heinrich VIII, Lord (1671–1673), Count (1673–1678)
Heinrich X, Lord (1673–1678), Count (1678–1678)
Heinrich III, Lord (1671–1673), co-Count (1673–1678), Count (1678–1710)
Heinrich VIII, co-Count (1673–1678), of Reuss-Hirschberg  (1678–?)
Heinrich X, co-Count (1673–1678), of Reuss-Ebersdorf (1678–?)

Saxe-Weimar (complete list) –
Friedrich Wilhelm I, Duke (1573–1602)
Johann II, Duke (1602–1605)
John Ernest I, Duke (1605–1620)
William I, Duke of Saxe-Weimar (1620–1644), of Saxe-Weimar-Eisenach (1644–1662)
John Ernest II, Duke of Saxe-Weimar (1662–1683), Regent of Saxe-Jena (1678–1683)
Johann Ernest III, co-Duke (1683–1707)
William Ernest, Duke of Saxe-Weimar (1683–1728), Regent of Saxe-Jena (1686–1690)

Saxe-Coburg (complete list) –
John Casimir, co-Duke of Saxe-Coburg-Eisenach (1572–1596), Duke of Saxe-Coburg (1596–1633)

Saxe-Eisenach (complete list) –
John Ernest I, co-Duke of Saxe-Coburg-Eisenach (1572–1596), Duke of Saxe-Eisenach (1596–1633), of Saxe-Coburg-Eisenach (1633–1638)

Saxe-Coburg-Eisenach (complete list) –
John Ernest I, co-Duke of Saxe-Coburg-Eisenach (1572–1596), Duke of Saxe-Eisenach (1596–1633), of Saxe-Coburg-Eisenach (1633–1638)

Saxe-Altenburg (complete list) –
Christian II, Elector (1591–1611), Regent of Saxe-Altenburg (1603–1611) 
John George I, Elector (1611–1656), Regent of Saxe-Altenburg (1611–1618)
Johann Philipp, Duke (1603–1639)
Friedrich Wilhelm II, Duke (1639–1669)
John George II, Elector (1656–1680), Regent of Saxe-Altenburg (1669–1672)
Frederick William III, Duke (1669–1672)
inherited by Saxe-Gotha to form Saxe-Gotha-Altenburg

Saxe-Eisenach (complete list) –
Albert IV, Duke (1640–1644)
William I, Duke of Saxe-Weimar (1620–1644), of Saxe-Weimar-Eisenach (1644–1662)
Adolf William, Duke (1662–1668)
William August, Duke (1668–1671)
John George I, Duke of Saxe-Marksuhl (1662–1686), of Saxe-Eisenach (1671–1686), Regent of Saxe-Eisenach (1668–1671), of Saxe-Jena (1683–1686)
John George II, Duke (1686–1698)
John William III, Duke (1698–1729)

Saxe-Jena (complete list) –
Bernard, Duke (1672–1678)
John Ernest II, Duke of Saxe-Weimar (1662–1683), Regent of Saxe-Jena (1678–1683)
John George I, Duke of Saxe-Marksuhl (1662–1686), of Saxe-Eisenach (1671–1686), Regent of Saxe-Jena (1683–1686), of Saxe-Eisenach (1668–1671)
William Ernest, Duke of Saxe-Weimar (1683–1728), Regent of Saxe-Jena (1686–1690)
Johann Wilhelm, Duke (1678–1690)
divided between Saxe-Weimar and Saxe-Eisenach

Saxe-Marksuhl (complete list) –
John George I, Duke of Saxe-Marksuhl (1662–1686), of Saxe-Eisenach (1671–1686), Regent of Saxe-Eisenach (1668–1671), of Saxe-Jena (1683–1686)
reincorporated into Saxe-Eisenach

Saxe-Weimar (complete list) –
Johann Ernest III, co-Duke (1683–1707)
William Ernest, Duke of Saxe-Weimar (1683–1728), Regent of Saxe-Jena (1686–1690)

Saxe-Gotha, Saxe-Gotha-Altenburg (complete list, complete list) –
Ernest I the Pious, Duke of Saxe-Gotha (1640–1672), of Saxe-Gotha-Altenburg (1672–1675)
Frederick I, Duke of Saxe-Gotha-Altenburg, co-Duke (1675–1680), Duke (1680–1691)
Albert V, co-Duke of Saxe-Gotha-Altenburg (1675–1680), Duke of Saxe-Coburg (1680–1699)
Bernhard I, co-Duke of Saxe-Gotha-Altenburg (1675–1680), Duke of Saxe-Meiningen (1680–1706)
Christian, co-Duke of Saxe-Gotha-Altenburg (1675–1680), Duke of Saxe-Eisenberg (1680–1707)
Henry, co-Duke of Saxe-Gotha-Altenburg (1675–1680), Duke of Saxe-Römhild (1680–1710)
Ernest, co-Duke of Saxe-Gotha-Altenburg (1675–1680), Duke of Saxe-Hildburghausen (1680–1715)
John Ernest IV, co-Duke of Saxe-Gotha-Altenburg (1675–1680), Duke of Saxe-Saalfeld (1680–1699), of Saxe-Coburg-Saalfeld (1699–1729)
Frederick II, Duke (1691–1732)

Saxe-Coburg (complete list) –
Albert V, co-Duke of Saxe-Gotha-Altenburg (1675–1680), Duke of Saxe-Coburg (1680–1699)
inherited by Saxe-Saalfeld to form Saxe-Coburg-Saalfeld

Saxe-Meiningen (complete list) –
Bernhard I, co-Duke of Saxe-Gotha-Altenburg (1675–1680), Duke of Saxe-Meiningen (1680–1706)

Saxe-Eisenberg (complete list) –
Christian, co-Duke of Saxe-Gotha-Altenburg (1675–1680), Duke of Saxe-Eisenberg (1680–1707)

Saxe-Römhild (complete list) –
Henry, co-Duke of Saxe-Gotha-Altenburg (1675–1680), Duke of Saxe-Römhild (1680–1710)

Saxe-Hildburghausen/ Saxe-Altenburg (complete list) –
Ernest, co-Duke of Saxe-Gotha-Altenburg (1675–1680), Duke of Saxe-Hildburghausen (1680–1715)

Saxe-Saalfeld, Saxe-Coburg-Saalfeld (complete list, complete list) –
John Ernest IV, co-Duke of Saxe-Gotha-Altenburg (1675–1680), Duke of Saxe-Saalfeld (1680–1699), of Saxe-Coburg-Saalfeld (1699–1729)

Schwarzburg-Rudolstadt (complete list) –
Albrecht VII, Count (1574–1605)
Charles Günther I, Count (1605–1630)
Albrecht Günther, Count (1612–1634)
Louis Günther I, Count (1630–1646)
Emilie of Oldenburg-Delmenhorst, Regent (1646–1662)
Albert Anton, Count (1646–1710)

Schwarzburg-Sondershausen (complete list) –
John Günther II, co-Count (1586–1631)
Anton Henry, co-Count (1586–1638)
Christian Günther I, co-Count (1586–1642)
, co-Count (1586–1643)
Anton Günther I, co-Count (1642–1666)
Anton Günther II, co-Count (1666–1697), co-Prince (1697–1716)
Christian William, co-Count (1666–1697), co-Prince (1697–1721)

County of Stolberg (de:complete list) –
Johann zu Stolberg, Count (1549–1612)
Heinrich XI. zu Stolberg-Stolberg, Count (1551–1615)
Wolfgang Georg zu Stolberg-Stolberg, Count (1582–1631)
, Count (1594–1669)
Friedrich Wilhelm, Count (1639–1684)
Christoph Ludwig I, Count (1634–1704)

Stolberg-Wernigerode (complete list) –
Henry Ernest, Count (1645–1672)
Ernest, Count (1672–1710)

Swabian

Prince-Bishopric of Augsburg (complete list) –
Heinrich von Knöringen, Prince-bishop (1599–1646)
Sigismund Francis, Prince-bishop (1646–1665)
Johann Christoph von Freyberg-Allmendingen, Prince-bishop (1666–1690)
Alexander Sigismund von der Pfalz-Neuburg, Prince-bishop (1690–1737)

 (complete list) –
Philip IV, Margrave (1588–1620)
Herman Fortunatus, Margrave (1620–1665)
Charles William, Margrave (1665–1666)

Margraviate of Baden-Baden/  (complete list) –
Ernest Frederick, Margrave of Baden-Durlach (1577–1604), of Baden-Baden (1594–1604)
Georg Friedrich, Margrave of Baden-Sausenburg (1577–1604), of Baden-Baden (1604–1621), of Baden-Durlach (1604–1638)
William, Margrave (1621–1677)
Louis William the Turkish, Margrave (1677–1707)

Margraviate of Baden-Durlach (complete list) –
Ernest Frederick, Margrave of Baden-Durlach (1577–1604), of Baden-Baden (1594–1604)
Georg Friedrich, Margrave of Baden-Sausenburg (1577–1604), of Baden-Baden (1604–1621), of Baden-Durlach (1604–1638)
Frederick V the Kinsman, Margrave (1638–1659)
Frederick VI the Turkish, Margrave (1659–1677)
Frederick VII Magnus, Margrave (1677–1709)

Prince-Bishopric of Constance (complete list) –
, Prince-bishop (1601–1604)
, Prince-bishop (1604–1626)
, Prince-bishop (1626–1627)
, Prince-bishop (1627–1644)
Franz Johann von Vogt von Altensumerau und Prasberg, Prince-bishop (1645–1689)
Marquard Rudolf von Rodt, Prince-bishop (1689–1704)

Prince-Provostry of Ellwangen (complete list) –
, Prince-provost (1584–1603)
Johann Christoph I of Westerstetten, Prince-provost (1603–1613)
, Prince-provost (1613–1620)
, Prince-provost (1621–1654)
, Prince-provost (1654–1660)
Johann Christoph von Freyberg-Allmendingen, Prince-provost (1660–1674)
, Prince-provost (1674–1687)
, Prince-provost (1687–1689)
Ludwig Anton von Pfalz-Neuburg, Prince-provost (1689–1694)
Francis Louis, Prince-provost (1694–1732)

Gutenzell Abbey (de:complete list) –
Maria Segesser von Brunegg, Princess-abbess (1567–1610)
Anna Segesser von Brunegg, Princess-abbess (1610–1630)
Maria Barbara Thumb von Neuburg, Princess-abbess (1630–1663)
Maria Franziska von Freyberg, Princess-abbess (1663–1696)
Maria Victoria Hochwind, Princess-abbess (1696–1718)

Hohenzollern-Hechingen (complete list) –
Eitel Friedrich IV, Count (1576–1605)
Johann Georg, Count (1605–1623), Prince (1623)
, Prince (1601–1661)
Philipp Christoph Friedrich, Prince (1661–1671)
Friedrich Wilhelm, Prince (1671–1735)

Hohenzollern-Sigmaringen (complete list) –
Charles II, Count (1576–1606)
Johann, Count (1606–1623), Prince (1623–1638)
Meinrad I, Prince (1638–1681)
Maximilian, Prince (1681–1689)
Meinrad II, Prince (1689–1715)

Princely Abbey of Kempten (complete list) –
Johann Adam Renner of Allmendingen, Prince-abbot (1594–1607)
Henry VIII of Ulm -Langenrhein, Prince-abbot (1607–1616)
Johann Eucharius of Wolffurt, Prince-abbot (1616–1631)
Johann Willibald Schenk of Castell, Prince-abbot (1631–1639)
:de:Roman Giel von Gielsberg, Prince-abbot (1639–1673)
:de:Bernhard Gustav von Baden-Durlach, Prince-abbot (1673–1677)
:de:Rupert von Bodman, Prince-abbot (1678–1728)

Königsegg (complete list) –
Marquard IV, Baron (1567–1626)
George II, Baron (1567–1622)
John William, Baron (1626–1663)

Königsegg-Aulendorf (complete list) –
John George, Baron (1622–1629), Count (1629–1666)
Anthony Eusebius, Count (1666–1692)
Francis Maximilian, Count (1692–1710)

Königsegg-Rothenfels (complete list) –
Hugh, Baron (1622–1629), Count (1629–1666)
Leopold William, Count (1666–1694)
Sigmund William, Count (1694–1709)

Lindau Abbey (de:complete list) –
Barbara von der Breiten-Landenberg, Princess-abbess (1578–1614)
Susanna von Bubenhofen, Princess-abbess (1614–1634)
Anna Christiane Hundbiss von Waltrams, Princess-abbess (1634–1676)
Maria Rosina Brymsin von Herblingen, Princess-abbess (1676–1689)
Maria Magdalena von Hallwyl, Princess-abbess (1689–1720)

Oettingen-Wallerstein (complete list) –
Wilhelm II, Count (1579–1602)
Ernst II, Count (1602–1670)
Wilhelm IV, Count (1670–1692)
Wolfgang IV, Count (1692–1708)

Stadion (complete list) –
John Philip, Lord (1666–1686), Baron (1686–1705), Count (1705–1741)

Weingarten Abbey (complete list) –
Georg Wegelin, Prince-abbot (1586–1627)
Franz Dietrich, Prince-abbot (1627–1637)
Domenicus I Laumann von Liebenau, Prince-abbot (1637–1673)
Alfons von Stadelmayer, Prince-abbot (1673–1683)
Willibald Kobold, Prince-abbot (1683–1697)
Sebastian Hyller, Prince-abbot (1697–1730)

Duchy of Württemberg (complete list) –
Frederick I, Duke of Württemberg, Duke (1593–1608)
John Frederick, Duke of Württemberg, Duke (1608–1628)
Eberhard III, Duke of Württemberg, Duke (1628–1674)
William Louis, Duke of Württemberg, Duke (1674–1677)
Eberhard Louis, Duke of Württemberg, Duke (1677–1733)

Swiss Confederacy

Italy

Republic of Genoa (complete list) –
Lorenzo Sauli, Doge (1599–1601)
Agostino Doria, Doge (1601–1603)
Pietro De Franchi Sacco, Doge (1603–1605)
Luca Grimaldi De Castro, Doge (1605–1607)
Silvestro Invrea, Doge (1607)
Gerolamo Assereto, Doge (1607–1609)
Agostino Pinelli Luciani, Doge (1609–1611)
Alessandro Giustiniani Longo, Doge (1611–1613)
Tomaso Spinola, Doge (1613–1615)
Bernardo Clavarezza, Doge (1615–1617)
Giovanni Giacomo Imperiale Tartaro, Doge (1617–1619)
Pietro Durazzo, Doge (1619–1621)
Ambrogio Doria, Doge (1621)
Giorgio Centurione, Doge (1621–1623)
Federico De Franchi Toso, Doge (1623–1625)
Giacomo Lomellini, Doge (1625–1627)
Giovanni Luca Chiavari, Doge (1627–1629)
Andrea Spinola, Doge (1629–1631)
Leonardo Della Torre, Doge (1631–1633)
Giovanni Stefano Doria, Doge (1633–1635)
Giovanni Francesco I Brignole Sale, Doge (1635–1637)
Agostino Pallavicini, Doge (1637–1639)
Giovanni Battista Durazzo, Doge (1639–1641)
Giovanni Agostino De Marini, Doge (1641–1642)
Giovanni Battista Lercari, Doge (1642–1644)
Luca Giustiniani, Doge (1644–1646)
Giovanni Battista Lomellini, Doge (1646–1648)
Giacomo De Franchi Toso, Doge (1648–1650)
Agostino Centurione, Doge (1650–1652)
Gerolamo De Franchi Toso, Doge (1652–1654)
Alessandro Spinola, Doge (1654–1656)
Giulio Sauli, Doge (1656–1658)
Giovanni Battista Centurione, Doge (1658–1660)
Gian Bernardo Frugoni, Doge (1660–1661)
Antoniotto Invrea, Doge (1661–1663)
Stefano De Mari, Doge (1663–1665)
Cesare Durazzo, Doge (1665–1667)
Cesare Gentile, Doge (1667–1669)
Francesco Garbarino, Doge (1669–1671)
Alessandro Grimaldi, Doge (1671–1673)
Agostino Saluzzo, Doge (1673–1675)
Antonio Da Passano, Doge (1675–1677)
Giannettino Odone, Doge (1677–1679)
Agostino Spinola, Doge (1679–1681)
Luca Maria Invrea, Doge (1681–1683)
Francesco Maria Imperiale Lercari, Doge (1683–1685)
Pietro Durazzo, Doge (1685–1687)
Luca Spinola, Doge (1687–1689)
Oberto Della Torre, Doge (1689–1691)
Giovanni Battista Cattaneo Della Volta, Doge (1691–1693)
Francesco Invrea, Doge (1693–1695)
Bendinelli Negrone, Doge (1695–1697)
Francesco Maria Sauli, Doge (1697–1699)
Girolamo De Mari, Doge (1699–1701)

Duchy of Milan (complete list) –
Philip II, Duke (1598–1621)
Philip III, Duke (1621–1665)
Charles I, Duke (1665–1700)
Philip IV, Duke (1700–1714)

Duchy of Modena (complete list) –
Cesare, Duke (1597–1628)
Alfonso III, Duke (1628–1629)
Francesco I, Duke (1629–1658)
Alfonso IV, Duke (1658–1662)
Francesco II, Duke (1662–1694)
Rinaldo, Duke (1695–1737)

Principality of Orange (complete list) –
Philip William, Prince (1584–1618)
Maurice, Prince (1618–1625)
Frederick Henry, Prince (1625–1647)
William II, Prince (1647–1650)
William III, Prince (1650–1702)

Papal States (complete list) –
Clement VIII, Pope (1592–1605)
Leo XI, Pope (1605)
Paul V, Pope (1605–1621)
Gregory XV, Pope (1621–1623)
Urban VIII, Pope (1623–1644)
Innocent X, Pope (1644–1655)
Alexander VII, Pope (1655–1667)
Clement IX, Pope (1667–1669)
Clement X, Pope (1670–1676)
Innocent XI, Pope (1676–1689)
Alexander VIII, Pope (1689–1691)
Innocent XII, Pope (1691–1700)
Clement XI, Pope (1700–1721)

Duchy of Savoy (complete list) –
Charles Emmanuel I, Duke (1580–1630)
Victor Amadeus I, Duke (1630–1637)
Francis Hyacinth, Duke (1637–1638)
Charles Emmanuel II, Duke (1638–1675)
Victor Amadeus II, Duke (1675–1730)

References 

17th century
 
-
17th century in the Holy Roman Empire